Richard Vreeland (born June 29, 1986), better known by his stage name Disasterpeace, is an American composer and musician. He first got started in music after learning the guitar in high school and started writing music around the age of 17. Known for his work as a chiptune artist, Vreeland has scored many video games, including Fez and Hyper Light Drifter. He stepped into film score composition with the 2015 film It Follows, and has since composed the scores for Marcel the Shell with Shoes On, Under the Silver Lake, Triple Frontier, and Bodies Bodies Bodies.

Childhood
Vreeland's first introduction to music was as a child, growing up in Staten Island. He spent a great deal of time learning from his step-father, who was a trained musician. In an interview, Vreeland stated, "As a child, I was mesmerized by drums. My step-father was the music director of our church and they would have band practice in the basement. Many of my fondest memories are of going down there to jam away on the drums, when they were there".

Career

Fez

Vreeland composed Fez's chiptune-esque electronic soundtrack. Despite his background in chiptune, Vreeland limited his use of that genre's mannerisms in the score. He worked with soft synth pads and reverb to push the score closer to an '80s synthesizer sound. He also reduced reliance on percussion and incorporated distortion techniques like bitcrushing and wow. Vreeland opted for slower passages with varying tempos that could "ebb, flow, and breathe with the player". He left some portions of Fez without music. Vreeland worked on its soundtrack at night for about 14 months while scoring Shoot Many Robots, and Brandon McCartin of Aquaria contributed the game's sound effects.

It Follows
In 2014, Vreeland produced the soundtrack for David Robert Mitchell's sophomore film It Follows, after being approached by Mitchell, a fan of Vreeland's work on the video game Fez.

Hyper Light Drifter
Disasterpeace composed the soundtrack for Hyper Light Drifter, a game developed by Heart Machine in 2016. The score follows Disasterpeace's previous soundtrack work and was listed as "One of the year's best scores, in any medium" by FACT.

Discography

Studio albums

EPs

Compilations

Soundtracks

References

External links
Official website

1986 births
21st-century American composers
American electronic musicians
American male composers
Chiptune musicians
Living people
Musicians from New York (state)
Video game composers
21st-century American male musicians